Astitva (meaning existence, identity) is a 2000 bilingual film made simultaneously in Marathi and Hindi, written and directed by Mahesh Manjrekar. The film tells the story of Aditi Pandit, a happily married woman whose husband Srikant becomes suspicious when she unexpectedly receives a fortune willed to her by her former music teacher, Malhar Kamat. Srikant Pandit tries to figure out why she had received inheritance from Kamat, many years after the music classes had ended, and subsequently makes a discovery.

Astitva won the National Film Award for Best Feature Film in Marathi in the year 2000. Tabu's performance was highly acclaimed winning her several awards and is considered one of her best.

Plot

Astitva encompasses issues such as male chauvinism, extramarital affairs, and spousal abuse. It is about a woman trying to find an identity outside her marriage.

It is 1997. Malhar Kamat (Mohnish Bahl), an old musician and music teacher, is dying. He prepares his will where he leaves his entire jaydad (estate) — comprising a haveli (mansion),  of land, 1,400 grams of gold and approximately 860,000 rupees — to Aditi Shrikant Pandit (Tabu). Upon his death two years later, the will is delivered to Aditi.

When the will reaches Aditi in Pune, she is in the midst of an impromptu party occasioned by the arrival of Dr. Ravi Bapat (Ravindra Mankani) and his wife Meghna (Smita Jaykar). Ravi is a very close friend of Aditi's husband, Shrikant Pandit (Sachin Khedekar). Aditi and Shrikant's only child, Aniket (Sunil Barve) introduces his girlfriend and would-be wife Revati (Namrata Shirodkar) to everyone at the party.

Shrikant opens the certified package that contains the will, even though it is addressed to Aditi, much to Meghna's chagrin and Ravi's surprise. Shrikant is intrigued and refers to his diaries from 25 years ago, in which he has chronicled events from his daily life. He realises that Aditi could not have possibly been pregnant from him at that time, because he was travelling on work. He shows her the diary, confronts her with the facts, and demands an explanation.

In a flashback, Shrikant is an up-and-coming star at a firm, seeking to break out onto his own. His work keeps him traveling almost constantly. This leaves his newlywed wife Aditi lonely and frustrated.

When she asks him to let her work someplace (clearly to relieve her boredom and find a good use for her time), he takes it as an insult and rebuffs her saying no woman in his family has ever worked outside the home and that he earns enough for them to live comfortably. He suggests (although not very enthusiastically) that she take up music. The music teacher is Malhar Kamat. Shrikant continues his unending travels all over the world, although he makes it clear to Malhar that music will not be anything more than a hobby for Aditi.

Aditi's sister Sudha (Resham Tipnis) and her husband come to live with Aditi. Their constant lovemaking further deepens Aditi's feelings of yearning and abandonment. And one spring afternoon, as Malhar breaks into his new ghazal in the rain, Aditi's resolve is broken under the influence of the season. Malhar returns a couple of days later, and Aditi asks him to leave stating she loves only Shrikant. Aditi has missed a period. Sudha learns this and advises her to do something.

When Shrikant returns, Aditi breaks down and tries to tell him the truth about her pregnancy. But Shrikant is doubly elated, having won the first major contract for his own firm and, hearing of his imminent fatherhood, and breaks out into celebrations without letting Aditi complete her story.

As the story comes back to present time, Shrikant punishes Aditi by making her tell the truth in front of Aniket, Ravi and Meghna. Meghna loathes Shrikant, since she suffered spousal abuse from her drunkard husband before divorcing him and marrying Ravi. Aniket is disgusted with his mother after knowing the truth of his existence.
Ravi confronts Shrikant, reminding him of his many extramarital affairs. Shrikant refuses to accept it stating he is a man and he did not bring any children, born of those affairs, home.

Shrikant decides that he will live with Aditi, but any spousal relationship between them will not exist. After Revati knows the truth, she breaks the engagement, not because of the truth, but because she realizes that Aniket is no different from the man whom he considered his father till now.

Meghna decides to take Aditi to Goa with her, but Aditi declines. Before leaving the house, she demands her husband and son's presences to hear her. She states how her weakness is called sin, whereas Shrikant's weaknesses are accepted easily. She questions who has the authority to accept his weakness. Aditi also reveals to Shrikant that she has harbored another secret from him that he is impotent and that is why she was not able to bear children with him. And how she could have been made responsible for that too if she didn't have a child. Revati enters the house and gives her new generation views to Aniket stating he is alive as his mother didn't decide otherwise. Aditi walks out of the house with Revati. The movie ends with Revati and Aditi walking out the house and on the road, whilst Shri and Aniket stand in the doorway, watching them go.

The denouement captures the essence of astitva.

Production
The role of lead actress was first offered to Madhuri Dixit, a leading lady of her times. When she rejected the offer, it went to Tabu, who received an important film of her acting career.

The story is based on Guy de Maupassant's novel "Pierre et Jean", which was also made into a movie Una mujer sin amor, a Spanish movie released in 1952.

Cast
Tabu as Aditi Pandit
Sachin Khedekar as Shrikant Pandit
Ravindra Mankani as Ravi
Smita Jaykar as Meghna
Mohnish Bahl as Malhar Kamat
Sunil Barve as Aniket
Namrata Shirodkar as Revati
Gulfam Khan as Asma Parveen
Resham Tipnis as Sudha

Music
"Chal Chal Mere Sang Sang" - Sukhwinder Singh
"Gaana Mere Bas Ki Baat Nahin" - Sadhana Sargam, Shankar Mahadevan
"Gaana Mere Bas Ki Baat Nahin v2" - Sadhana Sargam, Shankar Mahadevan
"Kitne Kisse Hain Tere Mere" - Hema Sardesai
"Main Thi Main Hoon" - Kavita Krishnamurthy
"Sabse Pehle Sangeet Bana" - Kavita Krishnamurthy, Sukhwinder Singh
"Spirit Of Astitva" - N/A
"Zindagi Kya Baat Hai" - Sukhwinder Singh

Accolades

Notes

References

External links
 

2000 films
2000s Hindi-language films
Films about women in India
Films about adultery in India
Indian feminist films
Indian drama films
Films directed by Mahesh Manjrekar
Films scored by Sukhwinder Singh
Best Marathi Feature Film National Film Award winners
Indian multilingual films
2000 multilingual films
2000s Marathi-language films
2000 drama films
Hindi-language drama films
2000s feminist films